Rebecca Torr (born 15 March 1990) is a snowboarder from New Zealand.

Born in Tauranga, she competed for New Zealand at the 2014 Winter Olympics in Sochi.

References

External links
 Fis-Ski.com – Biography

1990 births
Living people
New Zealand female snowboarders
Snowboarders at the 2014 Winter Olympics
Olympic snowboarders of New Zealand
Sportspeople from Tauranga